Caló is a language spoken by the Spanish and Portuguese Romani. It is a mixed language (referred to as a Para-Romani language in Romani linguistics) based on Romance grammar, with an adstratum of Romani lexical items through language shift by the Romani community. It is often used as an argot, a secret language for discreet communication amongst Iberian Romani. Catalan, Galician, Portuguese, and Spanish  are closely related varieties that share a common root.

, 'obscene language', lit. low-level ).

The language is mainly spoken in Brazil, Spain, France, Portugal and Colombia.

Etymology
 is the endonym of the Romani people in Iberia, and  means 'the language spoken by the '.

In  and other varieties of Romani,  means 'black' or 'absorbing all light', hence closely resembling words for 'black' and/or 'dark' in Indo-Aryan languages  (e.g. Sanskrit   'black', 'of a dark colour'). Hence  and  may have originated as ancient exonyms. For instance, the name of the Domba people, from whom the Romani, Sinti and Kale people are now believed to have emerged, also implies 'dark-skinned' in some Indian languages.

Nomenclature and dialect divisions

Three main groupings of Caló speakers are distinguished in what is technically Iberian  and south of France but most commonly referred to simply as (Spanish)  or Spanish Romani:
Spanish Caló
Occitan Caló
Portuguese Caló

Linguistic features

Phonology
Caló has six vowels:

It has the following consonant inventory:

Notable phonological features of Iberian Caló are:
 the loss of the distinction between aspirated , unaspirated  and voiced .
Brazilian Portuguese ,  > , .

Samples
Spanish Romani:

Parable of the Sower, Luke, 8, 4–8, as published by George Borrow in 1838
Compare with a Spanish version:

The Lord's Prayer
The Lord's Prayer has often been used as a parallel text:

Spanish Caló:

 Luke, 11, 2-4, Embéo e Majaró Lucas, translated by George Borrow, 1837.

Romani:

 Luke, 11, 2-4, Romani (Gypsy) New Testament: E Lashi Viasta. Ruth Modrow, 1984.

Spanish:

 Luke, 11, 2-4, Spanish Bible: Reina-Valera 1569, revised 1960.

Loans

Spanish
Many Caló terms have been borrowed in Spanish (especially as slangisms and colloquialisms), often through flamenco lyrics and criminal jargon.

In addition  and the noun  can also mean either "lie" or "con".

Caló also appears to have influenced Madrid slang  and quinqui, the language of another Iberian group of travellers who are not ethnically Romani.
, a cant spoken by makers of agricultural equipment in a village of Segovia, also derives some words from Caló.

Catalan
To a lesser extent than in Spanish, Caló terms have also been adapted into Catalan as slangisms and colloquialisms, most of which were taken adopted from Spanish slang.

"Do a long one" fig.

Portuguese
There is a small number of words of Caló (Calão) origin and many of those are indirect loans, borrowed via Spanish.

The examples generally understood by most or all speakers of Portuguese include  ("man, dude", primarily in Portugal), chavalo ("lad, young boy"),  (generally "impact", but in this sense "sudden happiness")  ("mess"),  ("bargain, haggled"),  ("drunkenness"), chulé ("bad smell of feet), pirar-se ("to leave"), pirado and chalado ("crazy").

Language maintenance
There is a growing awareness and appreciation for Caló: "...until the recent work by Luisa Rojo, in the Autonomous University of Madrid, not even the linguistics community recognized the significance and problems of Caló and its world." Its world includes songs, poetry and flamenco.

As Iberian Romani proper is extinct and as Caló is endangered, some people are trying to revitalise the language. The Spanish politician Juan de Dios Ramírez Heredia promotes Romanò-Kalò, a variant of International Romani, enriched by Caló words. His goal is to reunify the Caló and Romani roots.

Literature
In 1838, the first edition of Embéo E Majaró Lucas translated by George Borrow was published and began to be distributed in Madrid. This was Borrow's translation of the Gospel of Luke into Caló. A revision of this was printed in 1872.

See also
 Angloromani
 Erromintxela (Basque Romani)
 Germanía, a Spanish criminal jargon
 Romani language
 Spanish language
 Romani people in Portugal
 Romani people in Spain

References

External links

 The Romany language in Spain
 Romanò-Kalò (As promoted by Juan de Dios Ramírez Heredia) 
 List of Spanish words from Caló in the Diccionario de la Real Academia Española.

Cant languages
Languages of Portugal
Languages of Spain
Mixed languages
Romani in Brazil
Romani in France
Romani in Portugal
Romani in Spain
Para-Romani
Spanish dialects of Spain
Languages of France
Languages of Brazil
Languages of Colombia